Barahiya is a town and nagar parishad in Lakhisarai district  in the Indian state of Bihar. It has a total population of 43,032. It lies on the southern bank of the river Ganges, about 116.8 km east of Patna

Demographics
As of 2011 Indian Census, Barahiya had a total population of 43,032, of which 22,817 were males and 20,215 were females, with a sex ratio of 886. Population within the age group of 0 to 6 years was 6,706. The total number of literates in Barahiya was 26,746, which constituted 62.2% of the population with male literacy of 67.4% and female literacy of 56.2%. The effective literacy rate of 7+ population of Barahiya was 73.6%, of which male literacy rate was 80.1% and female literacy rate was 66.4%. The Scheduled Castes and Scheduled Tribes population was 4,185 and 28 respectively. Barahiya had 6893 households in 2011.

 India census, Barahiya had a population of 39,745. Males constitute 53% of the population and females 47%. Barahiya has an average literacy rate of 53% which is well below the national average of 59.5%; with 61% of the males and 39% of females literate. 15% of the population is under 6 years of age.

Transport

Barhiya is connected to major cities of India by the Delhi-Kolkata main line, as it falls on the Asansol-Patna section  which runs along the historic Grand Trunk road.

Notable people
Giriraj Singh, Indian politician, Member of Parliament, Lok Sabha and Minister of Ministry of Rural Development and Ministry of Panchayati Raj in the Government of India.

External links
 http://www.barahiya.com

References

Cities and towns in Lakhisarai district